Martin John Smith (born 10 December 1952), who writes children's books under the name Martin Conway is a British actor/writer.  Under the name Martin Tomms he has also written for TV (including Birds of a Feather) and radio, as Martin Tomms he also has worked as an actor on TV, radio and theatre.  Most of his recent acting work has been in touring productions of Shakespeare plays (most recently The Tempest in 2010), although he is possibly most widely recognised as the mad Brummie news vendor in a 2004 TV advert for the Birmingham Mail newspaper.

Written works
 Olaf the Viking, 2008, Oxford University Press
 Olaf the Viking and the Pig who would be King, 2009, Oxford University Press

References

External links

British children's writers
Living people
1952 births